The Saturday Show is Birmingham-based Central Television's Saturday morning children's TV programme which replaced their previous show Tiswas. It ran on ITV for two series between 23 October 1982 and 14 April 1984. It was originally planned that popular wrestler Big Daddy would host and that it would be called "Big Daddy's Saturday Show". A pilot show was recorded with Big Daddy presenting, assisted by Isla St Clair and short films were shot with Big Daddy to insert in the upcoming series; a trailer for "Big Daddy's Saturday Show", complete with logo was shown on ITV the Saturday morning before the show was due to air. It was then announced during the week that Big Daddy was dropping out and that Isla St Clair would now take the lead, with ex-Magpie host Tommy Boyd assisting and with Jeremy Beadle being used as an occasional "stand in" host. The actor David Rappaport was also a fixture playing the character "Shades" who had also been in the final series of Tiswas, as was footballer Jimmy Greaves.

It was never made publicly clear why Big Daddy dropped out so close to transmission; no settlement was ever reached between him and Central.

The second series of the show featured a regular technology spot called "Interface". Presented by IT journalist Chris Palmer, it featured a couple of notable TV firsts. It broadcast a computer program live which viewers could record from their TV and upload to a ZX Spectrum. The initial attempt failed due to interference on the feed from the studio floor, but it was re-broadcast the following week and many viewers successfully recorded and loaded the programme. The second 'first' for the show was the game "Up for Grabs" which was a game played live in the studio by a player in their own home via a computer and a modem. The contestant had to steer a robotic arm and pick up prizes from a rotating turntable. This proved incredibly difficult as the contestants found it difficult to gauge the depth of the arm and also the response time of the robot arm was slow. Still, this pre-dated many other interactive game shows by many years.

The programme was shown in most ITV regions except . TSW's show was

Series guide
Series 1: 26 editions, 23 October 1982 – 30 April 1983
Series 2: 31 editions, 3 September 1983 – 14 April 1984

TSW never broadcast series 1, instead opting to broadcast its own Saturday morning programme, also called The Saturday Show later renamed Freeze Frame. For Series 2 Both TSW and Channel Television (who finally started to broadcast before noon on Saturday) Finally started to broadcast the series from January 1984.

References

External links
 
 The Saturday Show on Paul Morris' SatKids

1982 British television series debuts
1984 British television series endings
1980s British children's television series
English-language television shows
ITV children's television shows
Television series by ITV Studios
Television shows produced by Central Independent Television